A finger sleeve is worn by certain basketball players to support and protect their fingers, as well as to enhance grip on the ball during a shot.  It is the player's preference on which finger the sleeve is worn. Many choose to wear more than one finger sleeve, such as Reggie Miller. The use of the finger sleeve is authorized and approved by the NBA (National Basketball Association).
In many cases the finger sleeve is worn for protection instead of performing some sort of taping job on the digit.

References

Basketball equipment
Sleeves
Fingers
Handwear